United States Patent Office Fire may refer to:
 1836 U.S. Patent Office fire
 1877 U.S. Patent Office fire